Public Domain Coffee is a coffee shop in Portland, Oregon. Coffee Bean International opened the cafe in 2010.

Description and history 

Coffee Bean International (CBI) opened Public Domain in 2010, following a rebrand of Portland Coffee House. The coffee shop serves as CBI's "showcase cafe" and specializes in pour-over coffee, according to Grant Butler of The Oregonian. The name is derived from the business' mission, which is "to roast exceptional coffees and cultivate a passion for coffee among the public".

In 2010, Hanna Neuschwander of Willamette Week described Public Domain as "exactly what you'd expect of a carefully, but cautiously designed corporate coffeehouse for high-quality coffee". Lonely Planet describes Public Domain as "a swanky downtown outlet with shiny high-end espresso machines, owned by long-time indie roasters". In her Insiders' Guide to Portland, Oregon, Rachel Dresbeck said Public Domain has "beautifully roasted single-origin varieties and a state-of-the-art Slayer espresso".

Reception 
Alexandra E. Petri included Public Domain in The Daily Meal 2014 list of 7 coffee shops to visit in Portland.

References

External links 

 
 Public Domain at Zomato

2010 establishments in Oregon
Coffeehouses and cafés in Oregon
Coffee in Portland, Oregon
Restaurants established in 2010
Restaurants in Portland, Oregon
Southwest Portland, Oregon